The Sindh women's cricket team is the women's representative cricket team for the Pakistani province of Sindh. They competed in the Women's Cricket Challenge Trophy in 2011–12 and 2012–13.

History
Sindh competed in the Twenty20 Women's Cricket Challenge Trophy in its first two seasons, in 2011–12 and 2012–13. They finished bottom of their group in both seasons, winning just one match, in 2013 against Balochistan by 2 wickets.

Players

Notable players
Players who played for Sindh and played internationally are listed below, in order of first international appearance (given in brackets):

 Sajjida Shah (2000)
 Armaan Khan (2005)
 Sumaiya Siddiqi (2007)
 Javeria Rauf (2008)
 Shumaila Qureshi (2010)
 Kainat Imtiaz (2010)
 Masooma Junaid (2011)
 Ayesha Zafar (2015)
 Aiman Anwer (2016)
 Rameen Shamim (2019)

Seasons

Women's Cricket Challenge Trophy

See also
 Sindh cricket team

References

Women's cricket teams in Pakistan
Cricket in Sindh